Park View High School is a public secondary school in Sterling, an unincorporated area in Loudoun County, Virginia, United States.  The school is part of Loudoun County Public Schools and is located at 400 West Laurel Avenue in the Sterling Park community.

History

Park View High School opened in 1976 and served the entire Sterling Park and Sugarland areas.  When Richard Bonieskie opened Park View, it offered state of the art facilities, including a large auditorium and a two-level library, which gave the school the nickname "University of Park View" during the years following its opening.

As eastern Loudoun County began to experience high growth in the 1980s and 1990s, a considerable portion of its student body was fed into Potomac Falls High School, which opened in 1997.  In 2003, more of Park View's student body were fed not only into Potomac Falls, but also into Dominion High School, which opened that year.

Park View was extensively renovated between 2002 and 2004.  The renovations included moving the library to the first floor, expanding it, adding classrooms on the second floor, reconstructing the main offices and guidance offices, the senior courtyard, and constructing a foyer on the front of the building.  In 2005, the auditorium was also renovated and features new seats, a new curtain, and new theater systems. In 2017, furniture and charging stations were added around the school.

Controversies
In 2014, three students of the graduating class of 2014 vandalized the school as their senior prank. School officials could not identify who the students were due to the students wearing masks. The graffiti contained explicit images and profane language, as claimed by the officials. The incident divided the student body in addition to angering the parents and school faculties.

In 2015, Park View student Danny Centeno-Miranda was shot and killed while on his way to school. Three people were caught and charged with crimes after the murder.

In 2018, a controversy arose after Park View received a donation from the Redskins to build a turf field. Backlash arose after the school's football program was canceled after lack of participation from students and alleged absence of funds. LCPS stated that coaches and directors were working hard towards creating a new schedule that better fits Park View's level of competitiveness. Due to the negative responses from the community, Hilarie Burton (Park View alumna) donated to the school in hopes of restoring the football programming in the following year.

Demographics

Enrollment by grade

Enrollment by race/ethnicity

Enrollment by gender

Total students: 1304

Accreditation and test scores

Accreditation
Park View High School is a fully accredited high school based on the Standards of Learning tests in Virginia.  The school went through SACS accreditation in November 2009.

Graduation statistics

Enrollment history

Notable alumni
Hilarie Burton, class of 2000, former MTV TRL VJ, actress, former star of One Tree Hill, starring in White Collar
Billy King, class of 1984, former basketball player and winner of the Henry Iba Corinthian National Defensive Player of the Year award with the Duke Blue Devils, former general manager and team president of the Philadelphia 76ers and former general manager of the Brooklyn Nets 
Jeff Lageman, class of 1985, former NFL defensive end for the Jacksonville Jaguars and the New York Jets
Allen Pinkett, class of 1982, former running back for the Notre Dame Fighting Irish and the Houston Oilers

See also
Loudoun County Public Schools

References

Public high schools in Virginia
Schools in Loudoun County, Virginia
Educational institutions established in 1976
1976 establishments in Virginia